Barbadian Trinidadian refers to Trinidadian people of full, partial or predominantly Barbadian ancestry or Barbadian-born people residing in Trinidad.

Trinidad